Kill the Sun is the second EP by American heavy metal band Cane Hill, released on January 18, 2019 through Rise Records. The EP was announced on November 16, 2018 alongside the title track "Kill the Sun", which was released as the lead single. The second single "Acid Rain" was released on December 14, 2018. According to lead vocalist Elijah Witt, Alice in Chains' 1994 acoustic EP Jar of Flies and the grunge era of MTV Unplugged were big influences on Kill the Sun, as well as R&B and pop music.

Track listing

Personnel
Cane Hill
 Elijah Witt – lead vocals
 James Barnett – guitars
 Ryan Henriquez – bass
 Devin Clark – drums, percussion, saxophone

Production
 Kris Crummett – production, recording, mixing, mastering

References

2019 EPs
Cane Hill (band) albums
Rise Records EPs